"Where Do I Put Her Memory" is a song written by Jim Weatherly, and recorded by American country music artist Charley Pride.  It was released in February 1979 as the third single from the album Burgers and Fries/When I Stop Leaving (I'll Be Gone).  The song Pride's twenty-first number one on the country chart and stayed at number one for one week and spent a total of ten weeks on the country chart.

Charts

Weekly charts

Year-end charts

References

1979 singles
Charley Pride songs
Songs written by Jim Weatherly
RCA Records singles
1979 songs